Stock Township, Ohio may refer to:

Stock Township, Harrison County, Ohio
Stock Township, Noble County, Ohio

Ohio township disambiguation pages